Lake Trakošćan is an artificial lake located in Trakošćan, Hrvatsko Zagorje, Croatia. The lake freezes over for three months during the winter. At its inception, the lake functioned as a fish pond, but retained its architectural importance to the present day.

See also 
Trakošćan
List of lakes of Croatia
House of Drašković

References 

Trakoscan
Landforms of Varaždin County
Trakoscan Lake